The Frink Medal for British Zoologists is awarded by the Zoological Society of London "For significant and original contributions by a professional zoologist to the development of zoology."  It consists of a bronze plaque (76 by 83 millimetres), depicting a bison and carved by British sculptor Elisabeth Frink. The Frink Medal was instituted in 1973 and first presented in 1974.

Recipients 
Source ZSL

See also

 List of biology awards

References

Notes

British science and technology awards
Zoology
Zoological Society of London
Biology awards
Awards established in 1973